Identity is the qualities, beliefs, personality traits, appearance, and/or expressions that characterize a person or group.

In sociology, emphasis is placed on collective identity, in which an individual's identity is strongly associated with role-behavior or the collection of group memberships that define them. According to Peter Burke, "Identities tell us who we are and they announce to others who we are." Identities subsequently guide behavior, leading "fathers" to behave like "fathers" and "nurses" to act like "nurses."

In psychology, the term "identity" is most commonly used to describe personal identity, or the distinctive qualities or traits that make an individual unique. Identities are strongly associated with self-concept, self-image (one's mental model of oneself), self-esteem, and individuality. Individuals' identities are situated, but also contextual, situationally adaptive and changing. Despite their fluid character, identities often feel as if they are stable ubiquitous categories defining an individual, because of their grounding in the sense of personal identity (the sense of being a continuous and persistent self).

In psychology

Erik Erikson (1902–1994) became one of the earliest psychologists to take an explicit interest in identity. An essential feature of Erikson's theory of psychosocial development was the idea of the ego identity (often referred to as the self), which is described as an individual's personal sense of continuity. He suggested that people can attain this feeling throughout their lives as they develop and is meant to be an ongoing process. The ego-identity consists of two main features: one's personal characteristics and development, and the culmination of social and cultural factors and roles that impact one's identity. In Erikson's theory, he describes eight distinct stages across the lifespan that are each characterized by a conflict between the inner, personal world and the outer, social world of an individual. Erikson identified the conflict of identity as occurring primarily during adolescence and described potential outcomes that depend on how one deals with this conflict. Those who do not manage a resynthesis of childhood identifications are seen as being in a state of 'identity diffusion' whereas those who retain their given identities unquestioned have 'foreclosed' identities. On some readings of Erikson, the development of a strong ego identity, along with the proper integration into a stable society and culture, lead to a stronger sense of identity in general. Accordingly, a deficiency in either of these factors may increase the chance of an identity crisis or confusion.

The "Neo-Eriksonian" identity status paradigm emerged in 1966, driven largely by the work of James Marcia. This model focuses on the concepts of exploration and commitment. The central idea is that an individual's sense of identity is determined in large part by the degrees to which a person has made certain explorations and the extent to which they have commitments to those explorations or a particular identity. A person may display either relative weakness or strength in terms of both exploration and commitments. When assigned categories, there were four possible results: identity diffusion, identity foreclosure, identity moratorium, and identity achievement. Diffusion is when a person avoids or refuses both exploration and making a commitment. Foreclosure occurs when a person does make a commitment to a particular identity but neglected to explore other options. Identity moratorium is when a person avoids or postpones making a commitment but is still actively exploring their options and different identities. Lastly, identity achievement is when a person has both explored many possibilities and has committed to their identity.

Although the self is distinct from identity, the literature of self-psychology can offer some insight into how identity is maintained. From the vantage point of self-psychology, there are two areas of interest: the processes by which a self is formed (the "I"), and the actual content of the schemata which compose the self-concept (the "Me"). In the latter field, theorists have shown interest in relating the self-concept to self-esteem, the differences between complex and simple ways of organizing self-knowledge, and the links between those organizing principles and the processing of information.

Weinreich's identity variant similarly includes the categories of identity diffusion, foreclosure and crisis, but with a somewhat different emphasis. Here, with respect to identity diffusion for example, an optimal level is interpreted as the norm, as it is unrealistic to expect an individual to resolve all their conflicted identifications with others; therefore we should be alert to individuals with levels which are much higher or lower than the norm – highly diffused individuals are classified as diffused, and those with low levels as foreclosed or defensive. Weinreich applies the identity variant in a framework which also allows for the transition from one to another by way of biographical experiences and resolution of conflicted identifications situated in various contexts – for example, an adolescent going through family break-up may be in one state, whereas later in a stable marriage with a secure professional role may be in another. Hence, though there is continuity, there is also development and change.

Laing's definition of identity closely follows Erikson's, in emphasising the past, present and future components of the experienced self. He also develops the concept of the "metaperspective of self", i.e. the self's perception of the other's view of self, which has been found to be extremely important in clinical contexts such as anorexia nervosa. Harré also conceptualises components of self/identity – the "person" (the unique being I am to myself and others) along with aspects of self (including a totality of attributes including beliefs about one's characteristics including life history), and the personal characteristics displayed to others.

In social psychology
At a general level, self-psychology is compelled to investigate the question of how the personal self relates to the social environment. To the extent that these theories place themselves in the tradition of "psychological" social psychology, they focus on explaining an individual's actions within a group in terms of mental events and states. However, some "sociological" social psychology theories go further by attempting to deal with the issue of identity at both the levels of individual cognition and of collective behaviour.

Collective identity

Many people gain a sense of positive self-esteem from their identity groups, which furthers a sense of community and belonging. Another issue that researchers have attempted to address is the question of why people engage in discrimination, i.e., why they tend to favour those they consider a part of their "in-group" over those considered to be outsiders. Both questions have been given extensive attention by researchers working in the social identity tradition. For example, in work relating to social identity theory, it has been shown that merely crafting cognitive distinction between in- and out-groups can lead to subtle effects on people's evaluations of others.

Different social situations also compel people to attach themselves to different self-identities which may cause some to feel marginalized, switch between different groups and self-identifications, or reinterpret certain identity components. These different selves lead to constructed images dichotomized between what people want to be (the ideal self) and how others see them (the limited self). Educational background and occupational status and roles significantly influence identity formation in this regard.

Identity formation strategies
Another issue of interest in social psychology is related to the notion that there are certain identity formation strategies which a person may use to adapt to the social world. Cote and Levine developed a typology which investigated the different manners of behavior that individuals may have. Their typology includes:

Kenneth Gergen formulated additional classifications, which include the strategic manipulator, the pastiche personality, and the relational self. The strategic manipulator is a person who begins to regard all senses of identity merely as role-playing exercises, and who gradually becomes alienated from their social self. The pastiche personality abandons all aspirations toward a true or "essential" identity, instead viewing social interactions as opportunities to play out, and hence become, the roles they play. Finally, the relational self is a perspective by which persons abandon all sense of exclusive self, and view all sense of identity in terms of social engagement with others. For Gergen, these strategies follow one another in phases, and they are linked to the increase in popularity of postmodern culture and the rise of telecommunications technology.

In social anthropology

Anthropologists have most frequently employed the term identity to refer to this idea of selfhood in a loosely Eriksonian way properties based on the uniqueness and individuality which makes a person distinct from others. Identity became of more interest to anthropologists with the emergence of modern concerns with ethnicity and social movements in the 1970s. This was reinforced by an appreciation, following the trend in sociological thought, of the manner in which the individual is affected by and contributes to the overall social context. At the same time, the Eriksonian approach to identity remained in force, with the result that identity has continued until recently to be used in a largely socio-historical way to refer to qualities of sameness in relation to a person's connection to others and to a particular group of people.

The first favours a primordialist approach which takes the sense of self and belonging to a collective group as a fixed thing, defined by objective criteria such as common ancestry and common biological characteristics. The second, rooted in social constructionist theory, takes the view that identity is formed by a predominantly political choice of certain characteristics. In so doing, it questions the idea that identity is a natural given, characterised by fixed, supposedly objective criteria. Both approaches need to be understood in their respective political and historical contexts, characterised by debate on issues of class, race and ethnicity. While they have been criticized, they continue to exert an influence on approaches to the conceptualisation of identity today.

These different explorations of 'identity' demonstrate how difficult a concept it is to pin down. Since identity is a virtual thing, it is impossible to define it empirically. Discussions of identity use the term with different meanings, from fundamental and abiding sameness, to fluidity, contingency, negotiated and so on. Brubaker and Cooper note a tendency in many scholars to confuse identity as a category of practice and as a category of analysis. Indeed, many scholars demonstrate a tendency to follow their own preconceptions of identity, following more or less the frameworks listed above, rather than taking into account the mechanisms by which the concept is crystallised as reality. In this environment, some analysts, such as Brubaker and Cooper, have suggested doing away with the concept completely. Others, by contrast, have sought to introduce alternative concepts in an attempt to capture the dynamic and fluid qualities of human social self-expression. Stuart Hall for example, suggests treating identity as a process, to take into account the reality of diverse and ever-changing social experience. Some scholars have introduced the idea of identification, whereby identity is perceived as made up of different components that are 'identified' and interpreted by individuals. The construction of an individual sense of self is achieved by personal choices regarding who and what to associate with. Such approaches are liberating in their recognition of the role of the individual in social interaction and the construction of identity.

Anthropologists have contributed to the debate by shifting the focus of research: One of the first challenges for the researcher wishing to carry out empirical research in this area is to identify an appropriate analytical tool. The concept of boundaries is useful here for demonstrating how identity works. In the same way as Barth, in his approach to ethnicity, advocated the critical focus for investigation as being "the ethnic boundary that defines the group rather than the cultural stuff that it encloses", social anthropologists such as Cohen and Bray have shifted the focus of analytical study from identity to the boundaries that are used for purposes of identification. If identity is a kind of virtual site in which the dynamic processes and markers used for identification are made apparent, boundaries provide the framework on which this virtual site is built. They concentrated on how the idea of community belonging is differently constructed by individual members and how individuals within the group conceive ethnic boundaries.

As a non-directive and flexible analytical tool, the concept of boundaries helps both to map and to define the changeability and mutability that are characteristic of people's experiences of the self in society. While identity is a volatile, flexible and abstract 'thing', its manifestations and the ways in which it is exercised are often open to view. Identity is made evident through the use of markers such as language, dress, behaviour and choice of space, whose effect depends on their recognition by other social beings. Markers help to create the boundaries that define similarities or differences between the marker wearer and the marker perceivers, their effectiveness depends on a shared understanding of their meaning. In a social context, misunderstandings can arise due to a misinterpretation of the significance of specific markers. Equally, an individual can use markers of identity to exert influence on other people without necessarily fulfilling all the criteria that an external observer might typically associate with such an abstract identity.

Boundaries can be inclusive or exclusive depending on how they are perceived by other people. An exclusive boundary arises, for example, when a person adopts a marker that imposes restrictions on the behaviour of others. An inclusive boundary is created, by contrast, by the use of a marker with which other people are ready and able to associate. At the same time, however, an inclusive boundary will also impose restrictions on the people it has included by limiting their inclusion within other boundaries. An example of this is the use of a particular language by a newcomer in a room full of people speaking various languages. Some people may understand the language used by this person while others may not. Those who do not understand it might take the newcomer's use of this particular language merely as a neutral sign of identity. But they might also perceive it as imposing an exclusive boundary that is meant to mark them off from the person. On the other hand, those who do understand the newcomer's language could take it as an inclusive boundary, through which the newcomer associates themself with them to the exclusion of the other people present. Equally, however, it is possible that people who do understand the newcomer but who also speak another language may not want to speak the newcomer's language and so see their marker as an imposition and a negative boundary. It is possible that the newcomer is either aware or unaware of this, depending on whether they themself knows other languages or is conscious of the plurilingual quality of the people there and is respectful of it or not.

In philosophy

Nietzsche called for a rejection of "Soul Atomism" in The Gay Science. Nietzsche supposed that the Soul was an interaction of forces, an ever-changing thing far from the immortal soul posited by both Descartes and the Christian tradition. His "Construction of the Soul" in many ways resembles modern social constructivism.

Heidegger, following Nietzsche, did work on identity. For Heidegger, people only really form an identity after facing death. It's death that allows people to choose from the social constructed meanings in their world, and assemble a finite identity out of seemingly infinite meanings. For Heidegger, most people never escape the "they", a socially constructed identity of "how one ought to be" created mostly to try to escape death through ambiguity.

Ricoeur has introduced the distinction between the ipse identity (selfhood, 'who am I?') and the idem identity (sameness, or a third-person perspective which objectifies identity).

In religion 
A religious identity is the set of beliefs and practices generally held by an individual, involving adherence to codified beliefs and rituals and study of ancestral or cultural traditions, writings, history, mythology, and faith and mystical experience. Religious identity refers to the personal practices related to communal faith along with rituals and communication stemming from such conviction. This identity formation begins with an association in the parents' religious contacts, and individuation requires that the person chooses the same or different religious identity than that of their parents.

The Parable of the Lost Sheep is one of the parables of Jesus, it is about a shepherd who leaves his flock of ninety-nine sheep in order to find the one which is lost. The parable of the lost sheep is an example of the rediscovery of identity their aim is to lay bare the nature of the divine response to the recovery of the lost, the lost sheep represents a lost human being.

Christian meditation is a specific form of personality formation, though often used only by certain practitioners to describe various forms of prayer and the process of knowing the contemplation of God.

In Western culture, personal and secular identity are deeply influenced by the formation of Christianity, throughout history, various Western thinkers who contributed to the development of European identity were influenced by classical cultures and incorporated elements of Greek culture as well as Jewish culture, leading to some movements such as Philhellenism and Philosemitism.

Implications
The implications are multiple as various research traditions are now heavily utilizing the lens of identity to examine phenomena. One implication of identity and of identity construction can be seen in occupational settings. This becomes increasing challenging in stigmatized jobs or "dirty work". Tracy and Trethewey state that "individuals gravitate toward and turn away from particular jobs depending in part, on the extent to which they validate a "preferred organizational self". Some jobs carry different stigmas or acclaims. In her analysis Tracy uses the example of correctional officers trying to shake the stigma of "glorified maids". "The process by which people arrive at justifications of and values for various occupational choices." Among these are workplace satisfaction and overall quality of life. People in these types of jobs are forced to find ways in order to create an identity they can live with. "Crafting a positive sense of self at work is more challenging when one's work is considered "dirty" by societal standards". "In other words, doing taint management is not just about allowing the employee to feel good in that job. "If employees must navigate discourses that question the viability of their work, and/ or experience obstacles in managing taint through transforming dirty work into a badge of honor, it is likely they will find blaming the client to be an efficacious route in affirming their identity".

In any case, the concept that an individual has a unique identity developed relatively recently in history. Factors influencing the emphasis on personal identity may include:

 in the West, the Protestant stress on one's responsibility for one's own soul
 psychology itself, emerging as a distinct field of knowledge and study from the 19th century onwards
 the growth of a sense of privacy since the Renaissance
 specialization of worker roles during the industrial period (as opposed, for example, to the undifferentiated roles of peasants in the feudal system)
 employment and occupation can work together to have an effect on a person's identity.
 increased emphasis on gender identity, including gender dysphoria and transgender issues

Identity changes
An important implication relates to identity change, i.e. the transformation of identity.

Contexts include:
 Radical career-change is when an individual drastically change your career path.
 Gender identity transition is when an individual experiences gender dysphoria, that persuades them to change their lives to fit into their gender identity.
 National immigration is an identity change because one has to adapt to a new society and these norms can vary across national context.
 Adoption is an identity change as well because one has to explore alternative features and coming to terms that one is adopted.
 Diagnosis of an illness can also be an identity change because this experience can change the way you view yourself. The identity shifts in the face of illness.

See also
 Identity politics
 International Identity Federation
 Otium
 Online identity
 Passing
 Racial dysphoria
 Role engulfment
 Self and Identity (journal)
 Self-consciousness
 Self-discovery
 Spoiled identity

Notes

References

Bibliography
 
 
 {{Cite journal
 | last1=Tracy | first1=S. J.
 | last2=Scott | first2=C.
 | year=2006
 | title=Sexuality, masculinity and taint management among firefighters and correctional officers: Getting down and dirty with America's heroes and the scum of law enforcement
 | journal=Management Communication Quarterly
 | volume=20 | issue=1
 | pages=6–38
 | doi=10.1177/0893318906287898
| s2cid=143657813
 | url=https://semanticscholar.org/paper/1b1b2a0a98f7dc6c5f9003c5055a7a93e4c4dba0
 }}

 Bray, Z. (2004). Living Boundaries: Frontiers and Identity in the Basque Country. Brussels: Presses interuniversitaires européenes, Peter Lang.

 Brockmeier, J. & Carbaugh, D. (2001). Narrative and Identity: Studies in Autobiography, Self and Culture. Amsterdam/Philadelphia: John Benjamins.

 Calhoun, C.	(1994). "Social Theory and the Politics of Identity," in C. Calhoun (Ed.), Social Theory and Identity Politics. Oxford: Blackwell.
 Camilleri, C.; Kastersztein, J. & Lipiansky E.M. et al. (1990) Stratégies Identitaires. Paris: Presses Universitaires de France.
 
 Carey, H. C. & McLean, K. (1864). Manual of social science; being a condensation of the "Principles of social science" of H.C. Carey, LL. D.. Philadelphia: H.C. Baird.
 Cohen, A. (1974). Two-Dimensional: an essay on the anthropology of power and symbolism in complex society. London: Routledge
 Cohen, A. (1998). "Boundaries and Boundary-Consciousness: Politicising Cultural Identity," in M. Anderson and E. Bort (Eds.), The Frontiers of Europe. London: Printer Press.
 Cohen, A. (1994). Self Consciousness: An Alternative Anthropology of Identity. London: Routledge.
 Hallam, E. M., et al. (1999). Beyond the Body: Death and Social Identity. London: Routledge. .
 
 
Kurzwelly, J (2019). "Being German, Paraguayan and Germanino: Exploring the Relation Between Social and Personal Identity". Identity. 19 (2): 144–156. doi:10.1080/15283488.2019.1604348.
 Little, D. (1991). Varieties of social explanation: an introduction to the philosophy of social science. Boulder: Westview Press. .
 Meyers, D. T. (2004). Being yourself: essays on identity, action, and social life. Feminist constructions. Lanham, Md: Rowman & Littlefield Publishers. 
 Modood, T. & Werbner P. (Eds.) (1997). The Politics of Multiculturalism in the New Europe: Racism, Identity and Community. London: Zed Books.
 
 

 Hasan Bülent Paksoy (2006) IDENTITIES: How Governed, Who Pays? Malaga: Entelequia. 2nd Ed.
 Sökefeld, M. (1999). "Debating Self, Identity, and Culture in Anthropology." Current Anthropology 40 (4), August–October, 417–31.
 Thompson, R.H. (1989). Theories of Ethnicity. New York: Greenwood Press.
 Vermeulen, H. & Gowers, C. (Eds.) (1994). The Anthropology of Ethnicity: 'Beyond Ethnic Groups and Boundaries'. Amsterdam: Het Spinhuis.
 Vryan, Kevin D., Patricia A. Adler, Peter Adler. 2003. "Identity." pp. 367–390 in Handbook of Symbolic Interactionism, edited by Larry T. Reynolds and Nancy J. Herman-Kinney. Walnut Creek, CA: AltaMira.
 Ward, L. F. (1897). Dynamic sociology, or Applied social science. New York: D. Appleton and company.
 Ward, L. F. (1968). Dynamic sociology. Series in American studies. New York: Johnson Reprint Corp.
 Weinreich, P. (1986). The operationalisation of identity theory in racial and ethnic relations, in J.Rex and D.Mason (eds). "Theories of Race and Ethnic Relations". Cambridge: Cambridge University Press.
 
 
 Werbner, P. and T. Modood. (Eds.) (1997). Debating Cultural Hybridity: Multi-Cultural Identities and the Politics of Anti-Racism. London: Zed Books.
 Williams, J. M. (1920). The foundations of social science; an analysis of their psychological aspects. New York: A.A. Knopf.
 Woodward, K. (2004). Questioning Identity: Gender, Class, Ethnicity.'' London: Routledge. .

Further reading

External links

Stanford Encyclopedia of Philosophy – Identity

 

Sociological terminology